Awadhi cuisine is a cuisine native to the Awadh region in Northern India. The cooking patterns of Lucknow are similar to those of Central Asia, the Middle East, and Northern India with the cuisine comprising both vegetarian and non-vegetarian dishes. The Awadh region has been greatly influenced by Mughal cooking techniques, and the cuisine of Lucknow bears similarities to those of Central Asia, Kashmir, Punjab and Hyderabad. The city is also known for its Nawabi foods.

Early history

The bawarchis (chefs) and rakabdars (gourmet cooks) of Awadh invented the dum style of cooking or the art of cooking over a slow fire, which has become synonymous with Lucknow today. Their spreads consisted of elaborate dishes such as kebabs, kormas, biryanis, kaliyas, nahari-kulchas, zarda, sheermal, rumali rotis, and warqi parathas. The richness of Awadh cuisine lies not only in the variety of cuisine but also in the ingredients used like mutton, paneer, and rich spices, which include cardamom and saffron.

Kebabs are an integral part of Awadhi. Lucknow is proud of its Kebabs. There are several varieties of popular kebabs in Awadhi cuisine viz. Kakori Kebabs, Galawat ke Kebabs, Shami Kebabs, Boti Kebabs, Patili-ke-Kebabs, Ghutwa Kebabs and Seekh Kebabs are among the known varieties.

The kebabs of Awadhi cuisine are distinct from the kebabs of Punjab insofar as Awadhi kebabs are grilled on a chula and sometimes in a skillet as opposed to grilled in a tandoor in Punjab. Awadhi kebabs are also called "chula" kebabs whereas the kebabs of Punjab are called "tandoori" kebabs.

List of popular kebabs
The Seekh kebab has long been considered a piece de resistance in the Awadhi dastarkhwan. Introduced by the Mughals it was originally prepared from beef mince on skewers and cooked on charcoal fire. Now lamb mince is preferred for its soft texture.

Established in 1905, Tunde ke Kabab in Chowk is the most famous outlet for Kababs even today. Tunde kabab is so named because it was the speciality of a one-armed chef. The tunde kabab claims to be unique because of the zealously guarded family secret recipe for the masala (homemade spices), prepared by women in the family. It is said to incorporate 160 spices.

Kakori kabab is considered blessed since it was originally made in the place by the same name in the dargah of Shah Abi Ahder Sahib with divine blessings. The meat used is from the tendon of the leg of mutton, combined with khoya and spices.

Shami kebab is made from mincemeat, usually with chopped onion, coriander, and green chillies added. The kebabs are round patties filled with spicy mix and tangy raw green mango. The best time to have them is in May, when mangoes are young. When mangoes are not in season, kamrakh or karonda may be substituted for kairi, as both have a tart flavour reminiscent of raw mango.

A variant made without any admixture or binding agents and comprising just the minced meat and the spices is the Galawat kabab.

An unusual offering is the Pasanda kebab, piccata of lamb marinated and then sautéed on a griddle.

Boti kebab is lamb marinated in yoghurt and cooked on skewers in a tandoor oven.

Vegetarian kebabs include Dalcha Kebab, Kathal ke Kebab, Arbi ke Kebab, Rajma Galoti Kebab (kidney bean kebab cooked with aromatic herbs), Zamikand ke Kebab (Lucknowi yam kebabs), etc.

Here is the list of some popular kebabs

Kakori kebabs
Kebabs of Galawat
Shami kebabs
Boti kebabs
Patili-ke kebabs
Ghutwa kebabs
Seekh kebabs

Culinary terms and techniques 
Awadhi cuisine, although similar to Mughlai cuisine, differentiates on the methodology of cooking. Where Mughal dishes are rich in fats due to extensive use of milk, cream and spices, Awadhi food is more subtle with just handful of spices.  Some Awadhi culinary techniques are given:

 Dum Dena
 Gile Hikmat
 Bhagona
 Deg/Degchi
 Seeni
 Durust Karna
 Ghee Durust Karna
 Dhungar/Dhuaan
 Bhagar
 Galavat
 Kadhai
 Lagan
 Loab/Rogan
 Moin
 Lobe Ka Tandoor
 Yakhni Cuts
 Zamin Doz
 Mahi Tawa
 Ittr

Curry preparations

Korma is the Indian name for the technique of braising meat. It originated in Mughlai cuisine wherein lamb or chicken was braised in velvety, spiced sauces, enriched with ground nuts, cream and butter. While kormas are rich, they are also mild, containing little or no cayenne or chillies. There are both vegetarian (navratan korma) and non-vegetarian (chicken, lamb, beef and fish korma) varieties of korma. Murgh Awadhi Korma is a classic from Lucknow.

Rice preparations

Biryani is widely popular in Awadhi cuisine. When cooking it, pulao is first made by cooking basmati rice in ghee with warm, aromatic spices and then layered with a type of meat curry or marinade (depending on the type of biryani), sealed, and cooked over low heat until done.

Bread preparations 
As wheat is the staple food of the state, breads are very significant. Breads are generally flatbreads baked in a pan; only a few varieties are raised breads. Improvisations of the roti (or bread) are of different types and made in various ways and include the rumaali roti, tandoori roti, naan (baked in a tandoor), kulcha, lachha paratha, sheermaal and Bakarkhani.

Breads made of other grains have descriptive names only, thus we have Makai ki roti, Jowar ki roti (barley flour roti), Bajre ki roti (bajra is a grain only grown in India), chawal-ki-Roti (roti of rice flour).

Chapati is the most popular roti in India, eaten for breakfast, lunch, or dinner.
Puri are small and deep-fried so they puff up.
Paratha is a common roti variant that’s flaky, layered and lightly-fried. It’s frequently found stuffed with fillings of vegetables, pulses, cottage cheese, or mincemeat.
Rumali Roti is a thin bread baked on a convex metal pan. The Urdu/Hindi word rumaali means handkerchief.
Tandoori Roti is thicker bread that is baked in a tandoor, and can be crispy or chewy depending on its thickness. 
Naan is a pan-baked soft thick bread.
Sheermaal is a sweet baked yeast naan made with flour, milk, sugar, and saffron.
Baqarkhani is a variation of sheermaal that is cooked on a griddle rather than baked.

Desserts

Halwas of all kinds are a common dessert within the cuisine, particularly in winter. There are several varieties of these, prepared from different cereals, such as gram flour, sooji, wheat, nuts, and eggs. The special halwa or halwa sohan, has four varieties: Papadi, Jauzi, Habshi, and Dudhiya.

Chaat

Chaat originated in Uttar Pradesh but are now popular across South Asia as a staple of street food. The chaat variants are all based on fried dough, with various other ingredients. The original chaat is a mixture of potato , chickpeas, spices, chilli, Saunth (dried ginger and tamarind sauce), coriander leaves, and yogurt, but other popular variants include Aloo tikkis (garnished with onion, coriander, hot spices and a dash of curd), dahi puri, golgappa, dahi vada and papri chaat.

There are common elements among these variants including dahi, or yogurt; chopped onions and coriander; sev (small dried yellow salty noodles); and chaat masala, a spice mix typically consisting of amchoor (dried mango powder), cumin, Kala Namak (rock salt), coriander, dried ginger, salt, black pepper, and red pepper. The ingredients are combined and served on a small metal plate or a banana leaf, dried and formed into a bowl.

Nomenclature of Awadhi chefs 
A whole battalion of chefs used to serve the nawabs of Lucknow. Each chef had his own secret recipe which he used to impress the nawab and gain favours. They neither shared the recipe with anyone nor pass it down to their descendants. Hence, many dishes died with them. Due to their intricacies and the whim of nawab, many chefs or bawarchis were given honours and titles as reward. Some famous titles are:

 Bawarchis
 Nanfus
 Rakhabdar
 Daroga-e-Bawarchikhana(Head of kitchen)

There were competitions organised for chefs to prove their talent. The best dish or the one most liked by nawab was then rewarded. Thus each chef tried to do his best and present the most exotic dish. So, from there many dishes and cooking styles originated i.e. galawat, dum pukht, kulfi, etc. A legend is said that a chef was only appointed to make mash ki dal (arhar ki dal) on a staggering salary of 500 a month.

Gallery

Awadhi dishes

Recipes

Following is list of few Awadhi recipes:
 Almond Kulfi
 Almond Seera
 Badam Halwa
 Boondi Raita
 Carrot Halwa
 Chicken Korma
 Dahi Gosht
 Fish Kebab
 Galouti Kebab
 Green Peas Paratha
 Gujia
 Gulab Jamun
 Gulkand Peda
 Imarti
 Indian Keema
 Jalebi
 Kachori
 Kaddu Ki Kheer
 Kanji Ke Vade
 Kathi Kebab
 Kele Ki Sabzi
 Khaja
 Kofta Curry
 Kurmura Ladoo
 Kuttu Paratha
 Lachcha Paratha
 Lamb kebab
 Malai Kofta
 Mango Burfi
 Methi Parathas
 Moong Dal Halwa
 Motichoor Ladoo
 Murgh Musallam
 Mushroom Biryani
 Mutton Kabab
 Naan
 Nargisi Kofta
 Navratan Korma
 Navratan Pulao
 Nawabi Curry
 Palak Paneer
 Paneer Korma
 Paneer Stuffed Tomatoes
 Paneer Tikka
 Papri
 Peas Pulao
 Phirni
 Rabdi
 Samosa
 Shahi Paneer
 Shami Kabab
 Tahari
 Thandai
 Til Papdi
 Vegetable Biryani
 Vegetable Pulav
 Yakhni Pulav
 Zafrani Kheer
 Zamin Doz Machhli
 Patili-ke Kebabs
 Ghutwa Kebabs
 Vegetable shami kabab
 Malpoa
 Rabadi
 Dahi balla

See also
 Awadh
 Lucknow
 Faizabad
 Indian cuisine
 Cuisine of Uttar Pradesh
 Mughlai cuisine
 Desi cuisine

References

External links

 Biryani : Their Kings and Kinds
 Indian Ambassador opens The thirteen-day Indian Food Festival 'Awadhi 'Lucknowi' in Doha
 'Almond Seera'

 
Lucknow
North Indian cuisine
Mughlai cuisine
Desi cuisine
Uttar Pradeshi cuisine
Muhajir cuisine